UFC Fight Night: Condit vs. Alves (also known as UFC Fight Night 67) was a mixed martial arts event held on May 30, 2015, at the Goiânia Arena in Goiânia, Brazil.

Background
The event was the second that the UFC has hosted in Goiânia, Brazil after UFC Fight Night: Belfort vs. Henderson on November 9, 2013.

The event was headlined by a welterweight bout between former WEC & Interim UFC Welterweight champion Carlos Condit and veteran contender Thiago Alves.

A welterweight bout between TJ Waldburger and Wendell Oliveira was originally booked for UFC Fight Night 61. However, the bout was cancelled on the day of the weigh-ins, after Waldburger passed out while cutting weight. The pairing had been rescheduled for this event, but it was scrapped yet again after Waldburger pulled out of the bout on May 19 due to undisclosed reasons. He was replaced by promotional newcomer Darren Till.

Gilbert Burns was expected to face Norman Parke at this event. However, Burns was forced to withdraw from the event due to injury and was replaced by Francisco Trinaldo.

Renato Moicano was expected to face Mirsad Bektić at the event. However, Moicano pulled out of the fight in late April due to a knee injury and was replaced by Lucas Martins.

Jessica Penne was expected to face Juliana Lima at the event. However on May 1, Penne was removed from the card and placed into a UFC Women's Strawweight Championship fight against champion Joanna Jędrzejczyk on June 20, 2015 at UFC Fight Night 69. She was replaced by promotional newcomer Ericka Almeida.

Yan Cabral was expected to face K. J. Noons at the event. However on May 19, Cabral pulled out of the fight due to dengue fever and was replaced by Alex Oliveira.

On June 18, it was announced that Rony Jason tested positive for hydrochlorothiazide, which is a banned diuretic, therefore his submission victory against Damon Jackson was overturned and he received a nine-month suspension. The UFC rescinded Jason's $50,000 "Performance of the Night" award. Jason requested an analysis of his second sample, which also came positive for the diuretic.
This card also featured the ufc debut of Darren Till

Results

Bonus awards
The following fighters were awarded $50,000 bonuses:

Fight of the Night: Charles Oliveira vs. Nik Lentz
Performance of the Night: Charles Oliveira and Rony Jason*

*Due to Jason's failed drug test, UFC rescinded his $50,000 "Performance of the Night" award. The award will not be reissued to a different fighter on the card.

See also
List of UFC events
2015 in UFC

References

UFC Fight Night
2015 in mixed martial arts
Mixed martial arts in Brazil
Sport in Goiânia
2015 in Brazilian sport
May 2015 sports events in South America